is a major Japanese entertainment conglomerate and a member of the Watanabe Production Group. Its head office is in Shibuya, Tokyo and the company's principle functions include organizing television and radio programming, managing Japanese entertainers as well as hosting foreign entertainers on visits to Japan, and planning and production of various commercial and goods advertising ventures.

The company is known informally as either Wanatanabe Entertainment (ワタナベエンターテインメント), Watanabe Enta (ワタナベエンタ) or simply WE.

The current president of the company is Miki Watanabe (渡辺ミキ), who has been leading the company since it was created from the parent company, Watanabe Productions (渡辺プロダクション) in 2000.

Current notable talents

Tarento
Affiliated idols are categorized here.

Male
Shouri Kondou
Mickey Curtis (actor)
Masaya Nakamura (actor)
Yuya Endo (actor)
Masaki Kaji (actor)
Osamu Hayashi (lecturer)
Hifumi Katō (professional shogi player)
K Dub Shine (hip-hop artist)
Kenta Nishimura (novelist)
Shiraku Tatekawa (rakugoka)
Sou Mizukami (quiz player)
D-Boys (actors group)
Masato Wada
Hiroki Suzuki
Hirofumi Araki (D-Date)
Kōji Seto (D-Date)
Tomo Yanagishita (D-Date)
Tetsuya Makita
Masahiro Usui
Masashi Mikami
Yamada Yusuke
Arata Horie (D-Date)
Shuto Miyazaki
Masaki Nakao
Yūki Yamada (D2)
Takahisa Maeyama (D2)
Atsushi Shiramata (D2)
Jun Shison (D2)

Female
Jun Amaki (gravure model)
Shizuka Ōya (idol, AKB48)
Gal Sone (competitive eater)
Yuki Kashiwagi (idol, AKB48)
Yoshiko Kuga (actress)
Asuka Kuramochi (tarento, former AKB48)
Marika Tani (idol, SKE48, former HKT48)
Nachu (tarento, former SDN48)
Akiko Matsumoto (tarento)
Sei Matobu (actress)
Sakura Miyajima (TV announcer)
Konomi Watanabe (child actress)

Comedians
Hideyuki Nakayama
Honjamaca (Hidehiko Ishitsuka and Toshiaki Megumi)
Neptune (Jun Nagura, Ken Horiuchi and Taizo Harada)
TIM (Golgo Matsumoto and Red Yoshida)
Ryo Fukawa
Bibiru Ōki
Xabungle (Yosuke Matsuo and Ayumu Kato)
Sayaka Aoki
Ungirls (Takushi Tanaka and Yoshiaki Yamane)
Choushinjuku (Eagle Mizokami, Tiger Fukuda, Thank You Yasutomi, Boo Fujiwara, Koala Koarashi and Ike Nwala)
Wagaya (Yoshiyuki Tsubokura, Hiroyuki Sugiyama and Shun Yatabe)
Lotti (Soichi Nakaoka and Kentaro Kokado)
Haraichi (Yu Sawabe and Yuki Iwao)
Sunshine Ikezaki
Abareru-kun
Atsugiri Jason
Hanako (Tatsuhiro Kikuta, Hiroki Akiyama and Dai Okabe)
Yonsentōshin (Takumi Goto, Hiroki Tsuzuki and Ryodai Ishibashi)
Nora Hirano
Nyanko Star (Super Sansuke and Angora Soncho)

Musical artists
Rag Fair
Yorico
Shoko Nakagawa
Little Glee Monster
Nokko

External links
Watanabe Entertainment information 
Watanabe Entertainment official homepage 

 
Japanese talent agencies
вообще ABOBA ТООП